Eretmocera pachypennis is a moth of the family Scythrididae. It was described by Strand in 1913. It is found in Equatorial Guinea.

References

pachypennis
Moths described in 1913